Alice Beatrice Roberts (March 7, 1905 – July 24, 1970) was an American film actress.

Early years
Roberts was born on March 7, 1905, in New York City. She was the daughter of Mr. and Mrs. Colin M. Roberts, and she attended Winthrop High School.

She entered several beauty pageants, including the 1924 and 1925 Miss America pageants in Atlantic City, New Jersey (as Miss Manhattan, 1924, and Miss Greater New York, 1925). She won the "Most Beautiful Girl in Evening Gown" award each time.

In 1916, Roberts was selected as the most beautiful girl at an annual Movie Ball contest in Boston.

Career 
Roberts went to Hollywood in 1933 and between then and 1946, she appeared in nearly 60 films, including the 1937 drama Love Takes Flight, in which she starred opposite Bruce Cabot. Many of her roles were small and uncredited. Her most notable role was that of Queen Azura in Flash Gordon's Trip to Mars, a 1938 serial.

Her last movie contract was with Universal, and her final appearances were in Criss-Cross and Family Honeymoon. Her acting career never becoming the success she had dreamed of, she left Hollywood in 1949.

Personal life 
On October 31, 1919, Roberts married Robert Ripley, owner of Ripley's Believe It or Not. Their marriage was "a union that only lasted three months, but which wasn't dissolved officially until 1926." She married Robert A. Dillon in Tijuana, Mexico, on May 17, 1928. That marriage was annulled on September 8, 1933, because Dillon had another wife when they were wed. In the 1940s, Roberts married John Wesley Smith.

Death 
Roberts died in Plymouth, Massachusetts, from pneumonia, aged 65.

Selected filmography

 Fast Life (1932) - Guest (uncredited)
 Melody Cruise (1933) - Ship Passenger (uncredited)
 Pilgrimage (1933) - Sick Nurse (uncredited)
 My Weakness (1933) - Mannequin. Woman's Journal (uncredited)
 My Woman (1933) - Party Girl (uncredited)
 The Worst Woman in Paris? (1933) - Gossip at Club Bon Vivant (uncredited)
 The Return of Chandu (1934, Serial) - Party Guest [Ch. 1] (uncredited)
 The Captain Hates the Sea (1934) - Passenger (uncredited)
 Night Life of the Gods (1935) - One of the 3 Graces (uncredited)
 Naughty Marietta (1935) - Minor Role (uncredited)
 Times Square Lady (1935) - Casa Nova Patron (uncredited)
 West Point of the Air (1935) - Woman in Party at Night Club (uncredited)
 China Seas (1935) - Ship's Passenger (uncredited)
 Broadway Melody of 1936 (1935) - Showgirl (uncredited)
 Wife vs. Secretary (1936) - Party Guest (uncredited)
 We Went to College (1936) - Sightseeing Alumnus's Wife (uncredited)
 San Francisco (1936) - Forrestal Guest (uncredited)
 Sinner Take All (1936) - Hat Check Girl (uncredited)
 Park Avenue Logger (1937) - Peggy O'Shea
 Bill Cracks Down (1937) - Susan Bailey
 Outlaws of the Orient (1937) - Alice
 Love Takes Flight (1937) - Joan Lawson
 Flash Gordon's Trip to Mars (1938, Serial) - Queen Azura
 The Devil's Party (1938) - Helen McCoy
 Pioneers of the West (1940) - Anna Bailey
 Tight Shoes (1941) - Waitress (uncredited)
 San Antonio Rose (1941) - Diner (uncredited)
 Mob Town (1941) - Bit Role (uncredited)
 Never Give a Sucker an Even Break (1941) - Stewardess (uncredited)
 Bombay Clipper (1942) - Miss Kane - Secretary (uncredited)
 What's Cookin'? (1942) - Miss Lewis (uncredited)
 Gang Busters (1942, Serial) - O'Brien's Secretary (uncredited)
 The Mystery of Marie Roget (1942) - Woman #2 Reading Newespaper (uncredited)
 It Comes Up Love (1943) - Bernice
 Frankenstein Meets the Wolf Man (1943) - Varja - Barmaid (uncredited)
 He's My Guy (1943) - Secretary (uncredited)
 Phantom of the Opera (1943) - Nurse (uncredited)
 Fired Wife (1943) - Divorcee (uncredited)
 Adventures of the Flying Cadets (1943, Serial) - Hill Aerial Secretary [Ch. 1] (uncredited)
 Top Man (1943) - War Plant Worker (uncredited)
 Phantom Lady (1944) - Monteiro's Maid (uncredited)
 Her Primitive Man (1944) - Maid (uncredited)
 Jungle Woman (1944) - Inquest Juror (uncredited)
 The Invisible Man's Revenge (1944) - Nurse (uncredited)
 Allergic to Love (1944) - Mrs. Walker (uncredited)
 Reckless Age (1944) - WAVE (uncredited)
 Dead Man's Eyes (1944) - Nurse (uncredited)
 Hi, Beautiful (1944) - Hostess (uncredited)
 Song of the Sarong (1945) - Radio Telephone Operator (uncredited)
 Strange Confession (1945) - Miss Rogers, Secretary (uncredited)
 This Love of Ours (1945) - Surgical Nurse (uncredited)
 Scarlet Street (1945) - Secretary (uncredited)
 Because of Him (1946) - Wife (uncredited)
 The Scarlet Horseman (1946) - Halliday's Maid (uncredited)
 The Mysterious Mr. M (1946) - Dr. Walker (uncredited)
 The Killers (1946) - Nurse (uncredited)
 White Tie and Tails (1946) - Marie (uncredited)
 The Brute Man (1946) - Nurse (uncredited)
 The Egg and I (1947) - Nurse (uncredited)
 Time Out of Mind (1947) - Mrs. Weber (uncredited)
 Ride the Pink Horse (1947) - Shop Manager (uncredited)
 The Senator Was Indiscreet (1947) - Woman (uncredited)
 Mr. Peabody and the Mermaid (1948) - Mother
 For the Love of Mary (1948) - Dorothy
 You Gotta Stay Happy (1948) - Maid (uncredited)
 An Act of Murder (1948) - Nurse Coble (uncredited)
 Family Honeymoon (1948) - Belle (uncredited)
 Criss-Cross (1949) - Nurse (uncredited) (final film role)

References

External links

 
 The Music of Flash Gordon: Flash Gordon's Trip to Mars

1905 births
Actresses from New York City
People from Plymouth, Massachusetts
American film actresses
1970 deaths
20th-century American actresses